The 2020 Tour was the twelfth headlining tour by American band Maroon 5. Visiting in Latin America only, the tour began on February 23, 2020 in Mexico City and was forced to conclude on March 10, 2020 in Montevideo, Uruguay, comprising 9 concerts.

Background
On November 11, 2019, Maroon 5 announced the 2020 Tour was revealed, which will take place in Latin America. The band confirmed more additional dates of the tour from November 19 and December 4, 2019, (with North America), respectively. Artists Meghan Trainor and Leon Bridges, were announced as opening acts in the North American leg in the summer. Since the tour began, the producer and sound engineer was Noah Passovoy, who served as touring DJ main opening act for the rest of the band's tour. During the March 2, 2020 show in Sao Paulo, Brazil, at Allianz Parque, the band, notably, continued the show despite heavy rain. On May 15, 2020, the band announced all dates of North American leg has been postponed to 2021, due to the coronavirus pandemic. The rescheduled dates will be billed as the MMXXI Tour.

Controversy
On February 27, 2020, the band performed at the Viña del Mar International Song Festival, a televised music festival in Chile. The presentation, which began 29 minutes late, was listed as "mediocre" by the specialized press, inside and outside Chile. The BBC said that Adam Levine performed the songs with "lack of energy and out of tune", adding that the disappointment of the fans increased when videos were leaked, when he was leaving the stage, showing him angry and saying that "they were deceived", that it was a concert for television, and that Viña del Mar is a "shitty city". That created an atmosphere of rejection inside and outside of his fans who were very upset by the words of disrespect from the band's leader. Levine later posted an apology for the incident on Instagram and the band said they had experienced technical difficulties with the audio feed to Levine's ear pieces.

Set list
The following set list was obtained from the concert held on February 28, 2020, in Santiago. It does not represent all concerts for the duration of the tour.

 "This Love"
 "What Lovers Do"
 "Makes Me Wonder"
 "Payphone"
 "Wait"
 "Love Somebody"
 "Moves Like Jagger"
 "Lucky Strike"
 "Sunday Morning"
 "Harder to Breathe"
 "Cold"
 "Don't Wanna Know"
 "One More Night"
 "Animals"
 "Daylight"
 "Sugar"
Encore
 "Memories"
 "Lost Stars"
 "She Will Be Loved"
 "Girls Like You"

Tour dates

Cancelled dates

References

Notes

Citations 

2020 concert tours
Maroon 5 concert tours
Concert tours of South America